Oxyhammus is a genus of longhorn beetles of the subfamily Lamiinae, containing the following species:

 Oxyhammus rubripes Breuning, 1978
 Oxyhammus scutellaris Kolbe, 1894
 Oxyhammus simplex Aurivillius, 1916
 Oxyhammus spinipennis Breuning, 1955
 Oxyhammus zanguebaricus Breuning, 1961

References

Lamiini